Ethylene bis stearamide (EBS) is an organic compound with the formula (CH2NHC(O)C17H35)2.  It is a waxy white solid and is also found as powder or beads that is widely used as a form release agent.  The compound is derived from the reaction of ethylenediamine and stearic acid.  It is a white solid of low toxicity that provides a slippery coating for a variety of applications.

Applications
EBS is a synthetic wax used as a dispersing agent or internal/external lubricant for benefits in plastic applications to facilitate and stabilize the dispersion of solid compounding materials to enhance processability, to decrease friction and abrasion of the polymer surface, and to contribute color stability and polymer degradation.

It is also used in process industries as release agent and antistatic agent for the production of thermoplastics,and wiring.  It is used in powder metallurgy.

References

Fatty acid amides
Lubricants